The Oxted line is a railway in southern England and part of the Southern franchise. The railway splits into two branches towards the south and has direct trains throughout to London termini.

It was opened jointly by the London, Brighton and South Coast Railway and the South Eastern Railway in the late 19th century.

The line branches from the London to Brighton Main Line (which has two diverging northern branches) at South Croydon in Greater London. The line then passes under the North Downs in two tunnels, and then splits into two branches at Hurst Green, adjoining Oxted in Surrey. One of these branches ends at East Grinstead, the other at Uckfield, both market towns in Sussex.

History

Conception
A line was proposed in 1864 from Croydon to Tunbridge Wells via Oxted by a group of former LB&SCR directors. Their proposal for the Surrey and Sussex Junction Railway (S&SJR) was to have the scheme underwritten and then operated by the LB&SCR.

However, the South Eastern Railway (SER) saw the S&SJR, and particularly the involvement of the LB&SCR chairman Leo Schuster, as a significant incursion into its territory. In addition to creating a rival to its own line to Tunbridge Wells, the SER saw the LB&SCR's direct involvement as contravening an 1849 agreement between the two companies. In retaliation, the SER put forward proposals for a 'London, Lewes and Brighton' railway together with the London Chatham and Dover Railway. As a result of these difficulties and the financial crisis of 1866–7, the LB&SCR signed a new agreement with the SER in which it withdrew support for the S&SJR, and the SER abandoned its scheme. Work on the S&SJR immediately ceased, but the holding company remained in existence until 1869, when it was merged with the LB&SCR and then closed.

On 10 March 1884, the LB&SCR and the SER formed a joint venture company, the Croydon, Oxted & East Grinstead Railway. Surveyed and engineered by the LB&SCR's Chief Engineer Frederick Banister, the proposed route in part used trackbed constructed for but never used by the S&SJR. The line was jointly owned and operated until , when it split into three:
to Crowhurst South junction, allowing connection to the SER's Redhill–Tonbridge line

Part-electrification
The Southern Railway electrified the Woodside and South Croydon Joint Railway in 1935 but the line closed in 1983. Some of the redundant materials were used to electrify the short section between South Croydon and Selsdon railway station in 1984 and a few electric trains then operated from London to Sanderstead via East Croydon. The section beyond Sanderstead to East Grinstead was electrified in 1987 at 750 V DC third rail.  However, the Uckfield branch is not electrified, and is worked by Class 171 diesel multiple units, which replaced Class 205 and Class 207 DEMUs.

Services 

Typical off-peak services on the Oxted Line are:

 2 tph from London Victoria to East Grinstead calling at Clapham Junction, East Croydon, Sanderstead, Riddlesdown, Upper Warlingham, Woldingham, Oxted, Hurst Green, Lingfield and Dormans
1 tph from London Bridge to Uckfield calling at East Croydon, Oxted, Hurst Green, Edenbridge Town, Hever, Cowden, Ashurst, Eridge, Crowborough and Buxted. In peak hours, this service increases to 2 tph.

In peak hours, 2 tph between Bedford/Luton and East Grinstead. This service calls at all stations between South Croydon and East Grinstead, except in the mornings southbound, and evenings northbound, it skips stations between Sanderstead and Oxted exclusive.

On Sundays, the London Bridge to Uckfield service runs only between Oxted and Uckfield.

Oyster and contactless payment cards are valid on the Oxted route as far as Upper Warlingham.

Connections with heritage railways 
The two branches of the line connect with different heritage railways directly: 
Through running to Network Rail started in March 2010, when GB Railfreight was contracted to run occasional trains carrying 1,000 tons of excavated material from the Bluebell's northern extension to a disposal site at Calvert, Buckinghamshire. Passenger services started on 23 March 2013.

Former connections and sub-branches
One branch formerly had three sub-branches:
from East Grinstead to:
Three Bridges
Lewes; the northernmost section of this branch is preserved as the Bluebell Railway, operated by steam and classic trains.
Tunbridge Wells.

(All three of these terminus towns are served by other lines.)

 Ashurst on the Uckfield branch was a junction for Tunbridge Wells (Kent) part of which is used by the 'Spa Valley Railway'.
 Eridge on the Uckfield branch is a junction for Tunbridge Wells (Kent) used by the 'Spa Valley Railway' It was until 1965 a junction for Cuckoo Line to Eastbourne.

A short stretch of the "main line", between Uckfield and Lewes is preserved at Isfield as the Lavender Line.

Between Hurst Green and Lingfield (in Surrey) there was a connection with the Redhill to Tonbridge line until 1965. Until 1983 there was a junction at Selsdon (in Greater London) with the Woodside and South Croydon Joint line to Elmers End.

Proposed developments 
A £140,000, six-month study was commissioned by the East Sussex County Council and Network Rail looking into the possibility of rebuilding the line between Uckfield and Lewes after a campaign by the Wealden Line Campaign Group. In July 2008 the Central Rail Corridor Board (a joint group of local councils and stakeholders) study, commissioned by Network Rail, reported that there was not a forecast viable economic case for reopening, citing a £141 million cost and a low anticipated benefit to cost ratio (BCR) of 0.64 to 0.79; in comparison a BCR of 1.5 was the minimum needed to obtain finance for the scheme.

Brighton Main Line 2
The line would branch off the East Coastway beyond . A new Ashcombe tunnel would be bored after crossing the A27 before crossing the Keymer Junction (in Burgess Hill) to Lewes line. The line would take back the preserved Lavender Line at Isfield. No stations would be reopened between Lewes and Uckfield, and all level crossings would be closed. New passing loops at Eridge would allow fast trains to overtake slower stopping services. The proposal also includes bringing the Eridge to Tunbridge Wells line back into operation, with through services to Brighton from Royal Tunbridge Wells.

Instead of carrying on to the Brighton Main Line, the line would branch off at Sanderstead and reopen the former line, but Croydon Tramlink has taken over the section between Coombe Road and Elmers End. The line would join the Hayes Line at Elmers End possibly alongside the proposed Bakerloo line extension to Hayes and then run to London Bridge, London Charing Cross and possibly on to the Thameslink network. There is also a suggestion for some trains to run on the East London line and branch off after Whitechapel to London Liverpool Street or onto a new line to Stansted Airport via Canary Wharf and Stratford. The whole project could see as little as one building demolished.

The project would have trains diverted away from bottlenecks at East Croydon and Windmill Bridge junction, and provided more capacity between London and Brighton.

See also
 Wealden Line

Further reading

References

External links 
 The Woodside & South Croydon Railway.
 Spa Valley Railway
 Brighton Main Line 2 website

Rail transport in Kent
Rail transport in Surrey
Rail transport in East Sussex
Transport in the London Borough of Croydon
Railway lines opened in 1884
Railway lines in London
Railway lines in South East England
Standard gauge railways in England
London, Brighton and South Coast Railway